The 1923 Prince Edward Island general election was held in the Canadian province of Prince Edward Island on July 24, 1923.

The opposition Conservatives led by James D. Stewart gained many seats to defeat the incumbent government of Liberal Premier John Howatt Bell.

This election had a number of firsts for PEI. It was the first election in which women on the Island could vote, following legislation passed in 1921.

It also featured the first organized third party in a PEI election, when local members of the Progressive Party ran four candidates in three Prince County districts and collected just over 2% of the vote.

Party Standings

Members Elected

The Legislature of Prince Edward Island had two levels of membership from 1893 to 1996 - Assemblymen and Councillors. This was a holdover from when the Island had a bicameral legislature, the General Assembly and the Legislative Council.

In 1893, the Legislative Council was abolished and had its membership merged with the Assembly, though the two titles remained separate and were elected by different electoral franchises. Assembleymen were elected by all eligible voters of within a district, while Councillors were only elected by landowners within a district.

Kings

Queens

Prince

Sources

Further reading
 

1923 elections in Canada
Elections in Prince Edward Island
1923 in Prince Edward Island
July 1923 events